The International Pitch and Putt Association (IPPA) is one of the governing bodies for the sport of pitch and putt in the world, along with the Federation of International Pitch and Putt Associations (FIPPA). IPPA was founded on 2 April 2009 in Madrid and includes all organizations that develop and maintain the sport of Pitch & Putt at a national and international level. IPPA is a non profit organization based in Madrid, Spain.

IPPA aspires to contribute to the global expansion of pitch and putt by establishing a close relationship between pitch and putt, golf and other relevant sports organizations. 
IPPA defines pitch and putt as golf with a difference and views pitch and putt as a speciality of golf.

IPPA's ambition is to promote the competitive sport of pitch and putt internationally by organizing competitions at the highest level, as well as activities of a cultural nature and promoting the development of youth participation in the sport.

The Founding members of IPPA are Association Française de Pitch & Putt (AFPP), Real Federación Española de Golf (RFEG), Federazione Italiana Pitch and Putt (FIP&P), Federação Portuguesa de Golfe (FPG), Federazione Sammarinese Golf (FSG) and Danish Pitch and Putt Union (DPPU). DPPU decided in December 2010 to go independent and therefore resigned as a member.

International Pitch and Putt Players Ranking; Top 10 players 

source: IPPA INDIVIDUAL PLAYERS RANKINGS

References 
 IPPA INDIVIDUAL PLAYERS RANKINGS TABLE - AS AT 31 DECEMBER 2012

External links 
International Pitch and Putt Association
Pitch and Putt forum
//Información sobre el P&P nacional e Internacional

Pitch and putt
Golf associations